Luis Alonso Anaya Merino (born May 19, 1981) is a Salvadoran former professional football player. He was banned for life in 2013, for match fixing while playing for the El Salvador national football team.

Club career
Anaya started his senior career at local side San José, before moving to Salvadoran Second Division side Platense where he stayed for almost 8 years.

In May 2005, he made his debut in the Primera División de Fútbol de El Salvador for Salvadoran giants FAS against Águila, whom he joined after winning the 2005 Clausura title with FAS a month after that debut.

In 2008, he signed with Chalatenango, only to move on to Alianza in the same year.

He joined CD UES for the 2010 Apertura season.

International career
Anaya officially received his first cap on October 7, 2006, in a friendly match against Panama.

He scored his first goal for the national team on August 22, 2007, in a friendly match against Honduras.

His second, and most important goal came almost a year later on June 22, 2008, in a FIFA World Cup qualification match against Panama.

His 87th-minute goal, led El Salvador to a 3–1 win, and in doing so helped secured the national team a spot in the following round of qualification.

He has earned a total of 35 caps, scoring 2 goals. He has represented his country in 8 FIFA World Cup qualification matches and played at the 2007 UNCAF Nations Cup. He also was a non-playing squad member at the 2007 CONCACAF Gold Cup.

He did not play for his country since an October 2008 FIFA World Cup qualification match against Suriname and was only over two years later called up for the 2011 Copa Centroamericana by then coach José Luis Rugamas.

With Rubén Israel as coach, Anaya was called up to take part at the 2011 CONCACAF Gold Cup where he earned 4 caps in 4 games.

Anaya received two yellow cards at the semi-finals match against Panama for complaining.

In a friendly match against Venezuela, on 7 August 2011, Anaya was sent off with two yellow cards, because he complained and celebrated in front of the technical area of the Venezuelans.

On September 20, 2013, Anaya was one of 14 Salvadoran players banned for life due to their involvement with match fixing.

International goals

Honours
Primera División de Fútbol de El Salvador: 2
 2005 Clausura, 2006 Clausura

References

External links
 
 Profile - El Gráfico 

1981 births
Living people
People from Cuscatlán Department
Association football central defenders
Salvadoran footballers
El Salvador international footballers
2007 UNCAF Nations Cup players
2007 CONCACAF Gold Cup players
2011 Copa Centroamericana players
2011 CONCACAF Gold Cup players
C.D. FAS footballers
C.D. Águila footballers
C.D. Chalatenango footballers
Alianza F.C. footballers
Sportspeople involved in betting scandals
Sportspeople banned for life